Khalil Uddin Mazumder is an Indian politician. He was elected to the Assam Legislative Assembly from Katigorah in the 2021 Assam Legislative Assembly election as a member of the Indian National Congress.

References 

Living people
Year of birth missing (living people)
Indian National Congress politicians from Assam